The People's Choice Award for Best Female Artist was first presented in 2000. Reba McEntire has won this award six times making her the most awarded artist in the category. Taylor Swift is the most nominated artist in the category with ten nominations. From 1975 to 1998 only winners were announced. Starting from 1999 multiple nominees were revealed before the winner was announced during the year's ceremony.

Winners and nominees

Category facts

Most wins

Most nominations

References

Female Artist
Music awards honoring women